Todd Starnes (born October 28, 1967) is a conservative American columnist, commentator, author and radio host. He has appeared on Fox & Friends and Hannity. In June 2017, Starnes began hosting a syndicated talk radio show on Fox News Radio. In October 2019, he was fired from Fox News and all affiliates after he endorsed the notion that American Democrats worship a pagan god, Moloch. In January 2020, Starnes, via his Starnes Media Group, purchased Memphis talk station 990 AM KWAM and translator 107.9 W300DE from Legacy Media for $685,000. KWAM will be the flagship station for Starnes' radio show.

Life and career

Starnes was born in Memphis, Tennessee. During the mid-1990s, he studied communication at Lee University in Cleveland, Tennessee, where he was an editor of the college newspaper, The Clarion.

He has been a reporter and anchor at news/talk radio station KFBK in Sacramento, California and a writer for the Baptist Press. Starnes joined Fox News Channel in 2005 as a radio news anchor. In 2007, he was assigned to cover Barack Obama's presidential campaign and traveled as an embedded reporter in the final weeks of the 2008 election. During that time, he also filled in on occasion as the radio network's White House correspondent. He reported from the 2008, 2012 and 2016 Republican and Democratic National Conventions. In 2011, Starnes was named the host of Fox News & Commentary.

Starnes became a featured Fox News columnist in 2011. His column is read online and through syndication.

In 2005, Starnes underwent surgery for a near-fatal heart valve condition exacerbated by obesity, the subject of his first book, They Popped My Hood and Found Gravy on the Dipstick (2009). He has also published Dispatches From Bitter America (2011), God Less America (2014), and The Deplorables' Guide to Making America Great Again (2017).

Controversies
Starnes' strongly conservative views, which he likes to air "to spice it up a little bit" to generate reader interest, have also generated controversy.

Firing from Baptist Press
In 2003, when employed by the Baptist Press, Starnes misquoted U.S. Secretary of Education Rod Paige from an interview.  The interview spawned national headlines and several members of Congress called on Paige to resign over comments on religion and the public schools. Ultimately, the Baptist Press issued an apology noting "factual and contextual errors" and "misrepresentations" made by Starnes and saying that he "no longer will be employed to write for the Baptist Press".

American Sniper
In 2015, he courted controversy for his response to the film American Sniper, stating of the main character: "Jesus would tell that God-fearing, red-blooded American sniper, ‘Well done, thou good and faithful servant.’ "

Removal of historical Confederate monuments and statues
Starnes has referred to removing symbols of the old Confederacy from public places as "cultural cleansing."

The Deplorables' Guide to Making America Great Again
In 2017 The Deplorables' Guide to Making America Great Again debuted on the USA Today, Publishers Weekly, and Conservative Book Club's best seller lists. The New York Times did not list the book as one of its top 10 non-fiction paperback books.

Judge Kavanaugh protesters 
In 2018, Starnes wrote on Twitter that protesters who disrupted the Supreme Court confirmation vote of Brett Kavanaugh (who had been accused of sexual assault) were "screaming animals" who "should be tasered, handcuffed, and dragged out of the building."

Firing from Fox News Radio
In 2019, he was fired from Fox Radio News after agreeing with one of his guests who said Democrats were not Christians but worshiped Moloch.

Call for destruction of Afghanistan cities in punitive attacks
On August 26, 2021, after the deaths of Marine and Navy servicemembers in the 2021 Kabul airport attacks, Starnes tweeted, "For every American who is killed, a city in Afghanistan should be wiped off the face of the Earth."

References

External links

American columnists
Living people
American broadcast news analysts
American political commentators
American political writers
American male non-fiction writers
American conservative talk radio hosts
Baptists from Tennessee
Fox News people
1967 births
Christian fundamentalists
21st-century American journalists
21st-century American male writers
21st-century American non-fiction writers
American male journalists
Writers from Memphis, Tennessee
Journalists from Tennessee
Lee University alumni